Black Denim Lit is an American, web-based literary magazine and print anthology dedicated to compositions having unique and lasting artistic merit from new and established writers. Content selected for inclusion favor the general non-genre literary category as well as science fiction and fantasy, although any genre work may appear. It publishes flash fiction, short stories, novelettes, reviews, interviews, and items of interest to those interested in creative writing. There is a focus on the electronic publishing, making sure that all content is also available on almost all eBook storefronts worldwide, free where ever possible. Black Denim Lit was founded by Christopher T. Garry in Seattle, Washington. He is the managing editor.

The magazine is not part of the VIDA Count, but they track and report metric themselves. Their proportion of female to male writers in the acceptances sent through April 9, 2014 is 16%.

Issues 
One key element to Black Denim Lit is that there are no prescribed themes during the submission phase. Instead, each issue develops its own theme through submissions. Recent issues and their resulting themes:

July, 2014: Sex
June, 2014: Inner Demon
May, 2014: Avatar as Self  
April, 2014: Mortality
March, 2014: Dark Fantasy
February, 2014: Terraforming

Notable contributors
Since the first issue went live, Black Denim Lit has featured the work of several authors and artists from different countries. Contributors include:

 Phil Richardson, USA
 Oscar Windsor-Smith, UK
 Steven Crandell, USA
 Chad Greene, USA
 Michael Fontana, USA
 Bob Carlton, USA

 David W. Landrum, USA
 Ted Morrissey, USA
 Sean Monaghan, New Zealand
 Alan Bray USA
 Lela Marie De La Garza USA
 Dave Morehouse USA

 Ken Poyner USA
 Konstantine Paradias Greece
 Janet Slike USA
 Susan Sage USA
 Michael Reilly USA

Masthead
 Christopher T. Garry - Founding and Managing Editor
 Hedwika Cox - Assistant Editor
 Heather Brown - Assistant Editor

See also
List of literary magazines
List of art magazines

References

External links
 Black Denim Lit
 Duotrope Digest
 The Grinder

2014 establishments in Washington (state)
Biannual magazines published in the United States
Magazines established in 2014
Magazines published in Seattle
Monthly magazines published in the United States
Online literary magazines published in the United States
Science fiction magazines published in the United States
Science fiction digests